, provisional designation , is a resonant trans-Neptunian object of the plutino population, located in the outermost region of the Solar System, approximately  in diameter. It was discovered on 11 October 1996, by astronomers Jane Luu, David C. Jewitt and Chad Trujillo at the Mauna Kea Observatories, Hawaii, in the United States. The very reddish RR-type with a highly eccentric orbit has been near its perihelion around the time of its discovery. This minor planet was numbered in 2000 and has since not been named. It is probably not a dwarf planet candidate.

Orbit and classification 

 belongs to the dynamical population of plutinos, named after its largest member, Pluto. Plutinos are resonant trans-Neptunian objects in a 2:3 orbital resonance with Neptune, which means that they orbit the Sun exactly twice while Neptune orbits the Sun three times.

It orbits the Sun at a distance of 26.3–52.0 AU once every 244 years and 10 months (89,435 days; semi-major axis of 39.14 AU). Its orbit has a notably high eccentricity of 0.33 and an inclination of 6° with respect to the ecliptic. Among the plutinos,  has one of the most elliptical orbits, with a perihelion almost halfway between Uranus (19.2 AU) and Neptune (30.1 AU). The body's observation arc begins with its official discovery observation at Mauna Kea in October 1996. Calculations by the Minor Planet Center in 1997 showed that the eccentric orbit of  comes within 6.9 AU of Uranus and stays more than 22.6 AU from Neptune over a 14,000-year period centered on the present.

Inside Neptune's orbit 

In 2000, this object came closest to the Sun (perihelion) at 26.3 AU, and has since moved away to a distance of 29.2 AU by the end of 2018. This means that this small plutino is still well inside the orbit of Neptune which has a semi-major axis of 30.1 AU.

Like Pluto, this plutino spends part of its orbit closer to the Sun than Neptune. Like all resonant trans-Neptunian objects its orbit is dominated by Neptune. Simulations by the Deep Ecliptic Survey (DES) show that over the next 10 million years  can acquire a perihelion distance (qmin) as small as 25.9 AU. Objects like Huya and the plutino  are also currently inside the orbit of Neptune.

Numbering and naming 

This minor planet was numbered by the Minor Planet Center on 26 July 2000 and received the number  in the minor planet catalog. As of 2018, it has not been named.

Physical properties

 has a RR taxonomic class, with "very red" surface in the visible (rather than a "neutral" or "grey-blue" one for objects of the BB class) and a flat featureless infrared spectrum. In 2015, Irina Belskaya published the following color indices: B–V (1.050), V–R (0.660) and V–I (1.310). The resulting B–R magnitude is 1.71. These indices agree with the results obtained by the Herschel Space Observatory (Mommert): B–V (1.030), V–R (0.660) and V–I (1.320), and also agree with previous measurements by Olivier Hainaut: B–V (1.031), V–R (0.655) and V–I (1.324), as well as B–V (0.984), V–R (0.654) and V–I (11.337) from in 2012 and 2002, respectively. The numerous results are summarized at the Small Body Data Ferret.

Diameter and albedo 

The results supersedes a previous study that gave a much larger diameter of 350 kilometers with a lower albedo of 0.03. According to Michael Brown, it is "probably not" a dwarf planet candidate, due to its relatively small diameter estimated at 158 kilometers. The Collaborative Asteroid Lightcurve Link assumes an albedo of 0.10 and derives a diameter of 139.81 kilometers based on an absolute magnitude of 7.39.

Rotation period 

 was part of a rotational lightcurve study which was published in the journal Nature in 1999. The photometric observations gave a brightness variation of no more than 0.12 magnitude, which is indicative of a rather spherical shape. As of 2018, the body's rotation period and pole remain unknown.

References

External links 
 List of Known Trans-Neptunian Objects, Johnston's Archive
 List of Transneptunian Objects, Minor Planet Center
 MPEC, Minor Planet Electronic Circular (MPEC 2009-A63), Minor Planet Center, 13 Jan. 2009
 Orbit Fit and Astrometric record for (15875), Marc Buie, Southwest Research Institute
 
 

015875
Discoveries by Jane Luu
Discoveries by David C. Jewitt
Discoveries by Chad Trujillo
19961011